Urraúl Bajo (Basque: Urraulbeiti) is a town and municipality located in the province and autonomous community of Navarre, northern Spain.
According to the 2014 census, the municipality has a population of 290 inhabitants. The head office of the Global Ecovillage Network is located in the ecovillage Arterra Bizimodu which has been established in Urraúl Bajo in 2014.

References

External links

 URRAUL BAJO in the Bernardo Estornés Lasa - Auñamendi Encyclopedia (Euskomedia Fundazioa) 

Municipalities in Navarre